The Abilene and Smoky Valley Railroad is a heritage railway located in Abilene, Kansas, United States.

It is a non-profit organization that offers public excursion train rides May through October. The depot is located in the Historic 1887 Rock Island Depot, Old Abilene Town, south of the Dwight D. Eisenhower Presidential Library & Museum.

A 1919 steam locomotive was under restoration from 2005 to 2008. It was first steamed up and moved under power in the fall of 2008. Starting May 23, 2009 the ex-Santa Fe 3415 became the only operational steam locomotive in the state of Kansas. The 4-6-2 Pacific locomotive hauls the train once a month.

When the steam engine is not running, the regular tourist train is pulled by an ALCO S-1 locomotive that used to work for the Hutchinson Northern Railroad (HNRR). The locomotive, #4, was donated to the A&SVRR by the HNRR when it was retired. The locomotive is a type normally used for switching and has 660 horsepower.  

Dinner trains are operated once a month.

The trip travels along an old Chicago, Rock Island and Pacific Railroad line that used to run from Herington to Salina. At Enterprise passengers are allowed to explore the caboose and locomotive. Seating in the diner or in open-sided gondola cars is available.  

Once a month an all-day excursion between Abilene and Woodbine is operated. At Enterprise passengers are transferred to a hyrail bus Silver Flyer Rail Bus, which can travel on both road and rail. After a short tour of Enterprise the bus is placed on a second section of trackage that extends east out of Enterprise, travels through Pearl and ends in Woodbine. The trip is narrated. At Woodbine lunch is provided as part of the ticket price. After lunch the bus travels back to Enterprise with stops to showcase some of the older stone work buildings still located in the area.  Upon arrival in Enterprise, the afternoon train returns to Abilene.

Caboose and locomotive cab rides are available at extra charge.

See also

List of heritage railways
List of Kansas railroads

References

External links
 Abilene & Smoky Valley Railroad
 Dickinson County Map

Heritage railroads in Kansas
Tourist attractions in Dickinson County, Kansas
Rail and road vehicle